Antoine Carré was a baroque guitarist and composer. He published two books of guitar tablatures.

Works
The first book is titled Livre de Guitarre Contenant Plusieurs Pièces...Avec la Manière de Toucher Sur la Partie ou Basse Continue, published in Paris in 1671 and is dedicated to the Princess Palatine.

The second book, Livre de Pièces de Guitarre de Musique... was also published in Paris (c. 1675, 1690 or 1720; but probably between 1675 and 1690).

French composers
French male composers
French classical guitarists
French male guitarists
French Baroque composers
Composers for the classical guitar
17th-century French people
Year of birth missing
Year of death missing
17th-century male musicians